Paul D. Muldowney (born June 28, 1935) is an American politician. He was a member of the Maryland House of Delegates, representing District 3A from 1979 to 1986.

Early life
Paul D. Muldowney was born on June 28, 1935, in Richmond, Virginia. He attended Benedictine College Preparatory. He graduated from Virginia Military Institute with a Bachelor of Science in Electrical Engineering in 1957.

Career
Muldowney worked as a business executive and served in the U.S. Army. Muldowney served as a member of the Maryland House of Delegates, representing District 3A from 1979 to 1986. He was elected as a Democrat. In 1994, Muldowney ran for Maryland's 6th congressional district seat in the U.S. Congress.

Personal life
Muldowney is married with seven children.

References

Living people
1935 births
Politicians from Richmond, Virginia
Virginia Military Institute alumni
United States Army soldiers
Democratic Party members of the Maryland House of Delegates
20th-century American politicians